Ten pennies is a multi-round Rummy-style card game, possible originating in Chicago. The major features different from most Rummy-style games are the limited purchasing of ten additional cards, and the winner wins the coins used in the game. The rules and strategy are simple enough for children to play, while still  being challenging to adult players. Playing with money is not required and anything such as chips or toothpicks may be used.

Gameplay

Setup
Ten Pennies is played with multiple 54-card decks of playing cards (standard 52-card decks plus jokers). Typically, the game is played with one deck for every two players (i.e. 8 players use 4 decks). If there are an odd number of players, it is better to round up (i.e. 7 players use 4 decks). Deuces (2s), Aces and Jokers are wild depending on the round being played.

Each player prepares a stack of ten pennies and places it on the table in front of them. These ten pennies must be kept separated from any other money on the table. This stack of ten pennies is referred to as their "buy" stack of pennies. The players then have an additional amount of money in front of them on the table consisting of all pennies, or any combination of pennies, nickels, dimes or quarters. This additional amount of money, while usually around two dollars, can be added to at any time and needs only be enough to complete the game. This additional money is used to pay for cards "caught" in a player's hand at the end of each round.

A small bowl is needed to collect all pennies and money used in the game. A scorepad is also needed to keep track of penalty points accumulated by each player during the game.

Dealing and cutting
Dealership rotates clockwise from round to round. Other people can help shuffle the cards if there are too many for one person to do it adequately. The dealer of the first round is determined by every player drawing a card from the deck. Highest card deals with Jokers being the highest card. If two or more people match the highest card, those people will continue drawing until a dealer is chosen. The dealer deals eleven cards to each player. After all the players' hands have been dealt, another card (the upcard) is placed face-up in a central location known as the discard pile or buy pile. The remainder of the pack is placed face-down and is called the deck or down pile.

Play
The person to the left of the dealer plays first. This player has the option of picking up the face-up card in the discard pile. If the player does not want the face-up card, the player indicates this by announcing to the other people that he/she does not want the At this point, the person immediately to the left of the player has the option to "buy" the card. If this person chooses to buy the card, they must use one of their ten pennies from their buy stack and put the penny into the money bowl. After picking up the face-up card, the buyer must also pick up two more cards from the deck.

The buyer cannot lay down any cards picked up until it is their turn. If the first person to the left of the player does not want to buy the face-up card, they must verbally declare to the other people that they don't want the card whereby the option goes to the next person to the left. The option goes around the table until either a person buys the card or nobody wants it. If the card is bought, or if the option expires, play resumes with the player. Note: Once a card in the discard pile has been passed over by all players, it cannot then be picked up by the player whose turn it is nor purchased in the future. The player then picks up the top card from the deck. Upon picking up either the discard card or the top card of the pile, the player attempts to satisfy the first down requirements of the round.

First-down requirements of each round
A "set" is a group of cards of the same value (i.e. all 8s) or a combination of same valued cards and wild cards as defined by the round. A set may consist of all wild cards or combinations of the same wild cards and other wild cards as long as the requirements of the round are satisfied.

If a player whose turn it is has the first-down requirement set of the round, the player has the option of laying down the first requirement set or passing. The player may not lay down any cards until it is their turn and they have first laid down the first-down requirement set. After that, the player has the option of continuing to lay down cards in sets of three or more using no more than one wild card per set of three, although three wild cards or two wild cards and a different wild card may be laid down. Once the player has laid down sets of cards, the player has the option of laying down an unlimited number of wild cards on any set thereby exhausting all wild cards in their hand if they so choose.

The player can also lay down any card that can play in any other player's sets. If all cards in the player's hand can either be played or played leaving one discard card, the player then has "gone out" and wins the round. If, however, the player reaches a point where no other cards can be laid down, the player discards one card face up on the discard pile and the turn passes to the next player to the left.

Scoring, penalties and endgame
Once a player goes out, the remaining players add up points of cards they were caught with in their hands. The card values are as follows:

The number of points each player was stuck with is tallied on the scorepad. In addition, each player counts the number of cards in their hand and puts a penny into the money bowl for each card in their hand.

At the completion of the seventh round, all scores are tallied and the player with the lowest score wins the game and all the money in the money bowl.

Strategy
Strategy centers on the purchasing of cards using the ten pennies. Purchasing of cards is limited so the timing and reason for purchase must be carefully considered. The reasons for purchasing a card may be:
 
The face-up card may help satisfy the first down requirement of a round or subsequent laying down of additional cards.
The face-up card may not help but it is hoped the two additional cards drawn might.
The card is bought to prevent others at the table from getting it or the two extra cards. 

There are several different strategies concerning timing of purchases:

The averaging method is to make one purchase per round and make an extra purchase in the last two rounds. This method can fail if opportunities are missed and you get stuck with many high-point cards.
The go-out-early method uses all purchases in the early rounds to build up a large lead and then high point cards are sloughed in the later rounds. This method fails if a large enough lead is not built up early.
The hold-out method makes few purchases in the early rounds, when it is easier to go out, and saves the purchases to the last few rounds when it is more difficult to make the first down requirements. This method fails if early opportunities are missed and you have too many points going into the final rounds.

Successful strategy balances both timing and reasons for purchase.

References

External links
a simplified version of the game from Seriousmoms.com

Rummy